Robert Vermeire (born 2 November 1944) is a Belgian former cyclo-cross cyclist. He notably won the UCI Amateur Cyclo-cross World Championships five times: in 1970, 1971, 1974, 1975 and 1977. He also won a bronze medal in the elite race at the 1979 UCI Cyclo-cross World Championships.

Major results

1965
 3rd National Amateur Championships
1967
 1st Steinmaur
1969
 2nd National Amateur Championships
 3rd  UCI Amateur World Championships
1970
 1st  UCI Amateur World Championships
 1st  National Amateur Championships
 1st Noordzeecross
1971
 1st  UCI Amateur World Championships
 1st  National Amateur Championships
1972
 1st  National Amateur Championships
 1st Jaarmarktcross Niel
1973
 1st  National Amateur Championships
 1st Otegem
 2nd  UCI Amateur World Championships
1974
 1st  UCI Amateur World Championships
 2nd National Amateur Championships
1975
 1st  UCI Amateur World Championships
 1st  National Amateur Championships
 1st Jaarmarktcross Niel
1976
 1st  National Amateur Championships
 1st Jaarmarktcross Niel
 2nd  UCI Amateur World Championships
1977
 1st  UCI Amateur World Championships
 1st  National Amateur Championships
 1st Diegem
1978
 1st  National Amateur Championships
 1st Jaarmarktcross Niel
 1st Duinencross Koksijde
1979
 1st Druivencross
 1st Jaarmarktcross Niel
 1st Duinencross Koksijde
 3rd  UCI World Championships
 3rd National Championships
1980
 2nd National Championships
 8th UCI World Championships
1981
 2nd National Championships
 6th UCI World Championships
1982
 2nd National Championships
 4th UCI World Championships
1983
 2nd National Championships
 6th UCI World Championships
1984
 2nd National Championships
 4th UCI World Championships
1985
 3rd National Championships
 10th UCI World Championships

References

External links

1944 births
Living people
Belgian male cyclists
Cyclo-cross cyclists
Belgian cyclo-cross champions
People from Beernem
Cyclists from West Flanders